Afash is a surname. Notable people with the surname include:

Fadi Afash (born 1974), Syrian footballer
Mohammad Afash (born 1966), Syrian footballer

See also
Afagh